William J. Magee (July 6, 1875 in New Brunswick, Canada) was a Major League Baseball pitcher.

A right-handed pitcher for the 1898 Louisville Colonels, Magee had a record of 16–15. He then continued his career with five National League teams in four more seasons. He walked more than twice as many batters as he struck out.

External links

Baseball Almanac

1875 births
19th-century baseball players
Baseball people from New Brunswick
Brockton Shoemakers players
Buffalo Bisons (minor league) players
Canadian expatriate baseball players in the United States
Major League Baseball pitchers
Louisville Colonels players
Philadelphia Phillies players
Washington Senators (1891–1899) players
St. Louis Cardinals players
New York Giants (NL) players
Major League Baseball players from Canada
Year of death missing
Worcester Farmers players
Worcester Quakers players
Montreal Royals players
Toronto Maple Leafs (International League) players
Wilkes-Barre Barons (baseball) players
Fitchburg (minor league baseball) players